Alan Albon (24 August 1921 – 30 March 1989) was a British anarchist, pacifist and publisher. He was born in Edmonton on 24 August 1921 and died at Heathrow on 30 March 1989.

Publishing
Early on in his career, he served as an editor and columnist for Freedom. In 1984 he met with Marcus Christo and Richard Hunt to form a magazine entitled Green Anarchist.

Politics 
As a pacifist, he enjoyed a brief stint in the Independent Labour Party.

References

1921 births
1989 deaths
Anarchist writers
British anarchists
British columnists
British newspaper editors
British pacifists
Green anarchists
People from Edmonton, London